Logical equivalent may refer to:
logical equivalence
exclusive nor, a logic gate